Gotcha! is the third album released by the salsa band DLG in April 20, 1999 by Sony Music. It includes well known singles such as Volvere. It is the last album to feature Huey Dunbar as the lead singer. It received a Grammy nomination for Best Salsa Album.

Track listing

 "Volveré" - 4:51
 "Eres Mi Vida" - 4:52
 "Got a Hook On You" (DLG Blues) - 5:00
 "Acuyuyé" - 4:52
 "Ángeles" - 4:50
 "A Veces Me Pregunto" - 4:50
 "De Oro" - 4:32
 "Prisionero" - 4:51
 "Gotcha" - 5:11
 "Volveré" (Bachata) - 4:36
 "La Quiero a Morir" (Bonus Track) - 5:01

Chart position

Certification

References

1999 albums
Dark Latin Groove albums
Albums produced by Sergio George